The Gwili Railway (Welsh: Rheilffordd Gwili) is a Welsh heritage railway, that operates a preserved standard gauge railway line from the site of Abergwili Junction (near Carmarthen) in southwest Wales along a  section of the former Carmarthen to Aberystwyth line. The original railway closed in 1965, with the track being lifted in 1975.

Original line 

The broad-gauge railway was opened in 1860 from Carmarthen to Conwil (now Cynwyl) by the ill-fated Carmarthen and Cardigan Railway Company (CCR), which fell in and out of insolvency until it was eventually absorbed by the Great Western Railway. Despite hostility from GWR, the line never actually reached Cardigan - getting no further than Newcastle Emlyn.

The Manchester and Milford Railway made a junction with the CCR at Pencader, making a through route to Lampeter which, in turn, later extended to Aberystwyth.

In its early days, the line thrived by serving the local farming and wool industries though, in the years following the First World War, this traffic gradually declined. The Second World War brought another lease of life as a relief route carrying heavy ammunition trains between south and north Wales.

Between the wars, the GWR sought to encourage traffic, opened several new halts along the route and provided camping coaches at several stations.

The route earned a reputation as a meandering rural branch; where trains trundled along, often flagged down by market-bound farmers' wives making their way across the fields to board the carriages. In fact, nearly three hours was permitted for the  journey between Carmarthen and Aberystwyth.

In the post-war years, closure of the spurs off the main line began. The Branches to Aberaeron and Newcastle Emlyn closed in 1952 which left only the route between Carmarthen and Aberystwyth open to traffic. The line enjoyed a brief resurgence in the 1950s, when the Royal Train traversed the route and other new traffic included Butlins through-specials taking holidaymakers to the new camp in Pwllheli.

However, declining passenger figures meant that the Beeching Axe was inevitable. In the end however, it was nature that struck the first blow. Heavy flooding severed the line  from Aberystwyth in December 1964, this taking place in the same weekend that storms that caused the Ruabon to Barmouth Line to suffer a similar washout. The last passenger train ran along the truncated route on 22 February 1965, two Hymek diesels providing the motive power. The line remained open for freight using Hymek locomotives until around 1970, then by Class 37 locomotives.  The freight traffic that kept the remainder of the line open was dominated mainly by milk traffic between Carmarthen and Lampeter where traffic was routed to both the last remaining part of the main line to Aberystwyth as far as the milk creamery at Pont Llanio (near Llanddewi-Brefi which survived until 1970, plus the Aberaeron branch as far as the milk creamery at Green Grove near Felin Fach which continued in service until discontinued by British Rail in 1973.

This resulted in the final closure of the line. Track was left in place until the summer of 1975.

Gwili Railway Preservation Company 
Following the line's closure, the Gwili Railway Preservation Company was formed with the ambition to preserve at least  of track of the former route, from Abergwili Junction right up the Gwili Valley to the station site at Llanpumpsaint.

Track lifting had already started at the time of the formation of the new Company and, as a result, only  of track north of Bronwydd Arms was left in situ, the Company being able to acquire the full 8-mile stretch of trackbed from Abergwili Junction to Llanpumsaint for both rebuilding and preserving.

The Gwili Railway was set up in 1975, and within three years the railway had purchased 8miles of track (between the sites of Abergwili Junction and Llanpumpsint railway station) and was running an initial steam-hauled service on a one-mile} section.

In April 1978, it re-opened the one-mile section of the Carmarthen-Aberystwyth route from its base at Bronwydd Arms, ( north of Carmarthen), making it the first standard-gauge heritage railway to operate in Wales.

The railway had been working south towards Carmarthen to a new station site named "Abergwili Junction" built on the northern outskirts of Carmarthen, at the site of the old and former Abergwili junction.

Route
Trains on the Gwili start from Bronwydd Arms where the replica GWR station is dominated by a Signal Box saved from Llandybie railway station on the Heart of Wales Line. The Signal box, which is open to the public, was built in 1885 and has been restored to operate signalling within the station area.

Typical features on the line include the gradients such as the 1 in 60 on the bank immediately north of Bronwydd Arms, the meandering River Gwili and the A484 road which are never far away and the wooded forests and sharp curves as the railway twists its way through the valley.

From Bronwydd, the line climbs between rural hills and meadows alongside the river River Gwili past the site of the first terminus of the newly opened Gwili Railway next to the old mill at Cwmdwyfran. From here, the line continues climbing until it passes under a rusticated brick bridge at the second terminus at the now defunct Penybont station.

The line carries over a redecked bridge crossing the River Gwili. This expansion was achieved in time for its 10th anniversary celebrations in 1988. At the same time, the new terminus of Llwyfan Cerrig was opened to the public.

In 2001, a further  extension built by volunteer labour was opened to a new halt at Danycoed.
 
Llwyfan Cerrig (in English, Stone Platform) was a former quarrymen's halt and the Gwili Railway has created a nature trail which winds through the old quarry and emerges above the stock sheds. The station building, which originally stood at Felin Fach on the Aberaeron branch and dates from 1911, was dismantled by volunteers and re-erected in the early 1990s. It has been restored and furnished to an authentic 1950s style.

 
From the platform, a path leads to a picnic area on the bank of the Gwili River where kingfishers and heron can sometimes be glimpsed. A miniature railway runs from this station and refreshments can be bought.

From Llwyfan Cerrig, the line runs uphill for another  with the River Gwili on one side and a rock face on the other, until it reaches the present end of the line at Danycoed (English translation being 'under the wood') where a typical GWR rural halt has been recreated.

Operationally, the railway is normally run on a 'one engine in steam' basis although the facility exists to pass trains at Llwyfan Cerrig at busy periods such as Day Out With Thomas events. In recent years, the Railway has expanded the portfolio of events on offer with Dining Trains, Driver Experience days and Jazz and other themed nights now being part of the annual timetable.

Incident
On 19 July 2006, a volunteer was killed in an accident when coupling carriages together for the train that was due to run that day.

Future expansion

Northwards 
Restoring the line northwards has proven to be more difficult than the Gwili Railway had initially anticipated, volunteers' high hopes of reaching either Cynwyl Elfed or Llanpumsaint having been hindered by the cost of repairing a number of bridges en route. There are a total of nine bridges between Danycoed Halt and Llanpumsaint, all of which are in poor condition and require extensive refurbishment to be made worthy for rail traffic once more. Eight of the bridges cross the River Gwili, whilst the ninth crosses a road immediately south of the site of Llanpumpsaint railway station.

An attempt was made in the early to mid 1990s to extend the railway by laying track southwards from the disused Conwil station site towards the railhead at Llwyfan Cerrig, but was frustrated by the escalating cost of repairing the three river bridges en route.

Beyond Llanpumsaint, the track-bed is virtually intact through the tunnel and up to just south of the site of Pencader station; however, the Gwili Railway has no plans to extend further in that direction as it neither owns the land nor has the necessary statutory powers to operate a railway north of Llanpumsaint, due to donations of track they have more than enough to extend to Conwil.

Southwards 

The closure of the former (now defunct) Swansea Vale Railway in 2007 resulted in a merger of that society with the Gwili. This has provided a boost to the southern extension (to Abergwili) with track materials, a footbridge, water tanks/cranes and signalling equipment from Swansea now earmarked for use on the Abergwili extension.

By 2016, the track had extended all the way down and into Abergwili Junction station itself. On 1 July the extension opened for 150 invited guests, with the extension opening to the public the day after, on 2 July. 

Abergwili Junction is the permanent southern terminus of the Gwili Railway. The Carmarthen East by-pass (constructed 1997 -1999) followed the course of the old line from Carmarthen to Llandeilo, rendering any extension of the line south beyond Abergwili Junction impossible.
However the Aberystwyth-Carmarthen Feasibility study states there is sufficient land alongside the west side of the bypass to reconnect the 2 km to Carmarthen station though it would require a new 100m skew bridge across the Afon Tywi just north of Carmarthen station.

Locomotives

 3879 Vulcan Foundry-built Austerity  locomotive built in 1945 (works number 5272). Rebuilt in 1961 by Hunslet Ltd (works number 3879). Withdrawn from operational services in early 2016, and now undergoing an overhaul. Named HAULWEN.
 7058 Robert Stephenson and Hawthorns  built in 1942. Named OLWEN. Used as Percy for Thomas the Tank Engine Events. Undergoing overhaul. Planned to be outshopped in GWR colours.
7849 Robert Stephenson and Hawthorns  built in 1955. Named No.47 Moorbarrow  and outshopped in a light blue livery, operational following completion of overhaul in July 2021.

Former steam locomotives
 71516 War Department  built in 1944 by Robert Stevenson Hawthorns (works number 7170) Named WELSH GUARDSMAN. Returned to service in 2013 following overhaul. Left for the Severn Valley Railway in February 2020.

References

External links

The Gwili Railway home page
Gwili Vintage Carriage Group's website
Carmarthen and Cardigan Railway
Gwili Steam Railway from WalesRails
National Heritage Railway Awards for Bonwydd Arms Level crossing gates 2011

Heritage railways in Carmarthenshire
Standard gauge railways in Wales